The Most Excellent Order of the British Empire is a British order of chivalry, rewarding contributions to the arts and sciences, work with charitable and welfare organisations, and public service outside the civil service. It was established on 4 June 1917 by King George V and comprises five classes across both civil and military divisions, the most senior two of which make the recipient either a knight if male or dame if female. There is also the related British Empire Medal, whose recipients are affiliated with, but not members of, the order.

Recommendations for appointments to the Order of the British Empire were originally made on the nomination of the United Kingdom, the self-governing Dominions of the Empire (later Commonwealth) and the Viceroy of India. Nominations continue today from Commonwealth countries that participate in recommending British honours. Most Commonwealth countries ceased recommendations for appointments to the Order of the British Empire when they created their own honours.

Current classes
The five classes of appointment to the Order are, from highest grade to lowest grade:
 Knight Grand Cross or Dame Grand Cross of the Most Excellent Order of the British Empire (GBE)
 Knight Commander or Dame Commander of the Most Excellent Order of the British Empire (KBE or DBE)
 Commander of the Most Excellent Order of the British Empire (CBE)
 Officer of the Most Excellent Order of the British Empire (OBE)
 Member of the Most Excellent Order of the British Empire (MBE)

Styles and honorary knighthoods
The senior two ranks of Knight or Dame Grand Cross, and Knight or Dame Commander, entitle their members to use the title of Sir for men and Dame for women before their forename. Most members are citizens of the United Kingdom or the Commonwealth realms that use the Imperial system of honours and awards.

Honorary knighthoods are appointed to citizens of nations where the monarch is not head of state, and may permit use of post-nominal letters but not the title of Sir or Dame. Occasionally, honorary appointees are, incorrectly, referred to as Sir or Dame. Honorary appointees who later become a citizen of a Commonwealth realm can convert their appointment from honorary to substantive, then enjoy all privileges of membership of the order, including use of the title of Sir and Dame for the senior two ranks of the Order. An example is Irish broadcaster Terry Wogan, who was appointed an honorary Knight Commander of the Order in 2005, and on successful application for British citizenship, held alongside his Irish citizenship, was made a substantive member and subsequently styled as Sir Terry Wogan.

History

King George V founded the order to fill gaps in the British honours system:

 The orders of the Garter, Thistle, and of St Patrick honoured royals, peers, statesmen and eminent military commanders;
 The Order of the Bath honoured senior military officers and civil servants;
 The Order of St Michael and St George honoured diplomats and colonial officials;
 The Order of the Star of India and the Order of the Indian Empire honoured Indian rulers and British and Indian officials of the British Indian Empire; and
 The Royal Victorian Order, in the personal gift of the monarch, honoured those who had personally served the royal family.
In particular, George V wished to create an order to honour the many thousands of those who had served in a variety of non-combat roles during the First World War. When first established, the Order had only one division. However, in 1918, soon after its foundation, it was formally divided into Military and Civil Divisions. The Order's motto is For God and the Empire.

At the foundation of the order, the Medal of the Order of the British Empire was instituted, to serve as a lower award granting recipients affiliation but not membership. In 1922, this was renamed the British Empire Medal (BEM). It stopped being awarded by the United Kingdom as part of the 1993 reforms to the honours system, but was again awarded beginning in 2012, starting with 293 BEMs awarded for Queen Elizabeth II's Diamond Jubilee. In addition, the BEM is awarded by the Cook Islands and by some other Commonwealth nations. In 2004, a report entitled A Matter of Honour: Reforming Our Honours System by a Commons committee recommended phasing out the Order of the British Empire, as its title was "now considered to be unacceptable, being thought to embody values that are no longer shared by many of the country's population".

Composition
The British sovereign is the supreme head of the order and appoints all other officers of the order (by convention, on the advice of the governments of the United Kingdom and some Commonwealth realms). The second senior-most officer is the Grand Master, of whom there have been three: Prince Edward, the Prince of Wales (1917–1936); Queen Mary (1936–1953); and the Duke of Edinburgh (1953–2021).

The order is limited to 300 Knights and Dames Grand Cross, 845 Knights and Dames Commander, and 8,960 Commanders. There are no limits applied to the total number of members of the fourth and fifth classes, but no more than 858 officers and 1,464 members may be appointed per year. Foreign appointees, as honorary members, do not contribute to the numbers restricted to the order as full members do. Although the Order of the British Empire has by far the highest number of members of the British orders of chivalry, with over 100,000 living members worldwide, there are fewer appointments to knighthoods than in other orders.

Though men can be knighted separately from an order of chivalry (Knight Bachelor), women cannot, and so the rank of Knight/Dame Commander of the Order is the lowest rank of damehood, and second-lowest of knighthood (above Knights Bachelor). Because of this, an appointment as Dame Commander is made in circumstances in which a man would be created a Knight Bachelor. For example, by convention, female judges of the High Court of Justice are created Dames Commander after appointment, while male judges become Knights Bachelor.

From time to time, individuals are appointed to a higher grade within the Order, thereby ceasing usage of the junior post-nominal letters.

Officers
In addition to the Sovereign and the Grand Master, the order has six further officers: The King of Arms is not a member of the College of Arms, as are many other heraldic officers. The Lady Usher of the Purple Rod does not – unlike the Order of the Garter equivalent, the Lady Usher of the Black Rod – perform any duties related to the House of Lords.

 Prelate: Bishop of London, the Rt Hon. & Rt Rev. Dame Sarah Mullally 
 Dean: Dean of St Paul's, the Very Rev. Andrew Tremlett
 Secretary: The Secretary of the Central Chancery of the Orders of Knighthood, Lt-Col Stephen Segrave
 Registrar: The Secretary of the Cabinet and Head of the Home Civil Service, Simon Case 
 King of Arms: Lt-Gen Sir Robert Fulton 
 Lady Usher of the Purple Rod: Dame Amelia Fawcett

Gallantry

Although initially intended to recognise meritorious service, the order began to also be awarded for gallantry. There were an increased number of cases in the Second World War for service personnel and civilians including the merchant navy, police, emergency services and civil defence, mostly MBEs but with a small number of OBEs and CBEs. Such awards were for gallantry that did not reach the standard of the George Medal, but, as an order, were listed before it on the Order of Wear. Awards for meritorious service usually appear without a citation but there were often citations for gallantry awards, some detailed and graphic. From 14 January 1958, these awards were designated Commander, Officer or Member of the Order of the British Empire for Gallantry.

Any individual made a member of the order for gallantry after 14 January 1958 wears an emblem of two crossed silver oak leaves on the same ribbon as the badge, with a miniature version on the ribbon bar when worn alone. When the ribbon only is worn the emblem is worn in miniature. It could not be awarded posthumously, and was replaced in 1974 with the Queen's Gallantry Medal (QGM). If recipients of the Order of the British Empire for Gallantry received promotion within the order, whether for gallantry or otherwise, they continued to wear also the insignia of the lower grade with the oak leaves. However, they used only the post-nominal letters of the higher grade.

Vestments and accoutrements
Members of the order wear elaborate vestments on important occasions (such as quadrennial services and coronations), which vary by rank (the designs underwent major changes in 1937):
 The mantle, worn by only Knights and Dames Grand Cross, was originally made of yellow satin lined with blue silk, but is now made of rose pink satin lined with pearl-grey silk. On the left side is a representation of the star (see below).
 The collar, also worn by only Knights and Dames Grand Cross, is made of gold. It consists of six medallions depicting the Royal Arms, alternating with six medallions depicting the Royal and Imperial Cypher of George V (GRI, which stands for ""). The medallions are linked with gold cables depicting lions and crowns.

On certain "collar days" designated by the Sovereign, members attending formal events may wear the order's collar over their military uniform, formal day dress, or evening wear. When collars are worn (either on collar days or on formal occasions such as coronations), the badge is suspended from the collar. Collars are returned upon the death of their owners, but other insignia may be retained.

On less important occasions, simpler insignia are used:

 The star is an eight-pointed silver star used by only Knights and Dames Grand Cross and Knights and Dames Commander. It is worn pinned to the left breast. Varying in size depending on class, it bears a crimson ring with the motto of the order inscribed. Within the ring, a figure of Britannia was originally shown. Since 1937, however, the effigies of George V and Mary of Teck have been shown instead.
 The badge is the only insignia used by all members of the order. Until 1937, it was suspended on a purple ribbon, with a red central stripe for the military division; since then, the ribbon has been rose-pink with pearl-grey edges, with the addition of a pearl-grey central stripe for the military division. Knights and Dames Grand Cross wear it on a riband or sash, passing from the right shoulder to the left hip. Knights Commander and male commanders wear the badge from a ribbon around the neck; male officers and members wear the badge from a ribbon on the left chest; all females other than Dames Grand Cross wear it from a bow on the left shoulder. The badge is in the form of a cross patonce (having the arms growing broader and floriated toward the end), the obverse of which bears the same field as the star (that is, either Britannia or George V and Queen Mary); the reverse bears George V's Royal and Imperial Cypher. Both are within a ring bearing the motto of the Order. The size of the badges varies according to rank: the higher classes have slightly larger badges. The badges of Knights and Dames Grand Cross, Knights and Dames Commander, and commanders are enamelled with pale blue crosses and crimson rings; those of officers are plain gold; those of members are plain silver.
 The British Empire Medal is made of silver. On the obverse is an image of Britannia surrounded by the motto, with the words "For Meritorious Service" at the bottom; on the reverse is George V's Imperial and Royal Cypher, with the words "Instituted by King George V" at the bottom. The name of the recipient is engraved on the rim. This medal is nicknamed "the Gong", and comes in both a full-sized and miniature versions – the latter for formal white-tie and informal black-tie occasions.
 A lapel pin for everyday wear was first announced at the end of December 2006, and is available to recipients of all levels of the order, as well as to holders of the British Empire Medal. The pin design is not unique to any level. The pin features the badge of the order, enclosed in a circle of ribbon of its colours of pink and grey. Lapel pins must be purchased separately by a member of the order. The creation of such a pin was recommended in Sir Hayden Phillips' review of the honours system in 2004.

Chapel

The Chapel of the Order of the British Empire is located in St Paul's Cathedral. It occupies the far eastern end of the cathedral crypt and was dedicated in 1960. The only heraldic banners normally on display in the chapel are those of the Sovereign of the Order of the British Empire and of the Grand Master of the Order of the British Empire. Rather than using this Chapel, the Order now holds its great services upstairs in the nave of the cathedral. In addition to the Chapel of the Order of the British Empire, St Paul's Cathedral also houses the Chapel of The Most Distinguished Order of St Michael and St George. Religious services for the whole Order are held every four years; new Knights and Dames Grand Cross are installed at these services.

Precedence and privileges

Knights Grand Cross and Knights Commander prefix Sir, and Dames Grand Cross and Dames Commander prefix Dame, to their forenames. Wives of Knights may prefix Lady to their surnames, but no equivalent privilege exists for husbands of Knights or spouses of Dames. Such forms are not used by peers and princes, except when the names of the former are written out in their fullest forms. Male clergy of the Church of England or the Church of Scotland do not use the title Sir as they do not receive the accolade (they are not dubbed "knight" with a sword), although they do append the post-nominal letters: dames do not receive the accolade, and therefore female clergy are free to use the title Dame.

Knights and Dames Grand Cross use the post-nominal GBE; Knights Commander, KBE; Dames Commander, DBE; Commanders, CBE; Officers, OBE; and Members, MBE. The post-nominal for the British Empire Medal is BEM.

Members of all classes of the order are assigned positions in the order of precedence. Wives of male members of all classes also feature on the order of precedence, as do sons, daughters and daughters-in-law of Knights Grand Cross and Knights Commander; relatives of Ladies of the Order, however, are not assigned any special precedence. As a general rule, individuals can derive precedence from their fathers or husbands, but not from their mothers or wives.

Knights and Dames Grand Cross are also entitled to be granted heraldic supporters. They may, furthermore, encircle their arms with a depiction of the circlet (a circle bearing the motto) and the collar; the former is shown either outside or on top of the latter. Knights and Dames Commander and Commanders may display the circlet, but not the collar, surrounding their arms. The badge is depicted suspended from the collar or circlet.

Current Knights and Dames Grand Cross
 Sovereign: Charles III
 Grand Master: Vacant

Knights and Dames Grand Cross

Military ranks listed denotes the awarded being in the military division.

Honorary

Recommendations by Commonwealth countries

Since the Second World War, several Commonwealth realms have established their own national system of honours and awards and have created their own unique orders, decorations and medals. 

Recommendations for appointments to the Order of the British Empire continue to be made by some Commonwealth realms. In 2019, Antigua and Barbuda, Bahamas, Barbados, Belize, Grenada, Papua New Guinea, Saint Christopher and Nevis, Saint Lucia, Saint Vincent and the Grenadines, the Solomon Islands, and Tuvalu, as well as the New Zealand associated state of the Cook Islands all included Order of the British Empire awards in their New Year's or Queen's Birthday honours lists. Canada seldom made recommendations for appointments to the Order of the British Empire except for the Second World War and Korea but continued to recommend gallantry awards for both military and civilians until the creation of the Order of Canada. Although the Commonwealth of Australia recommendations ended with the creation of the Order of Australia, Australian state governments continued to recommend the Order of the British Empire until the 1989 Queen's Birthday Honours, nearly 15 years later. The New Zealand Government ceased to recommend the Order in 1996, upon the establishment of the New Zealand Order of Merit, but the Government of the Cook Islands continues to do so.

Criticism

In 2003, The Sunday Times published a list of the people who had rejected the Order of the British Empire, including David Bowie, John Cleese, Nigella Lawson, Elgar Howarth, L. S. Lowry, George Melly, and J. G. Ballard.  In addition, Ballard voiced his opposition to the honours system, calling it "a preposterous charade".

The order has attracted some criticism for its naming having connection with the idea of the now-extinct British Empire. Benjamin Zephaniah, a British poet of Jamaican and Barbadian descent, publicly rejected appointment as an Officer in 2003 because, he asserted, it reminded him of "thousands of years of brutality". He also said that "it reminds me of how my foremothers were raped and my forefathers brutalised".

In 2004, a House of Commons Select Committee recommended changing the name of the award to the Order of British Excellence, and changing the rank of Commander to Companion; as the former was said to have a "militaristic ring".

A notable person to decline the offer of membership was the author C. S. Lewis (1898–1963), who had been named on the last list of honours by George VI in December 1951. Despite being a monarchist, he declined so as to avoid association with any political issues.

In 2019, John Oliver turned down an offer of an OBE, which would have been part of the Queen's New Year's Honours list.

The Beatles were appointed Members in 1965: John Lennon justified the comparative merits of his investiture by comparing military membership in the Order: "Lots of people who complained about us receiving the MBE [status] received theirs for heroism in the war – for killing people ... We received ours for entertaining other people. I'd say we deserve ours more". Lennon later returned his MBE insignia on 25 November 1969, as part of his ongoing peace protests. Other criticism centres on the view that many recipients of the Order are being rewarded with honours for simply doing their jobs; critics say that the Civil Service and Judiciary receive far more orders and honours than leaders of other professions.

Chin Peng, a veteran guerrilla fighter of the Malayan Peoples' Anti-Japanese Army, was appointed as an Officer for his role in fighting against the Japanese occupation of Malaya during World War II, in close co-operation with the British commando Force 136. Several years after WWII, his OBE membership was withdrawn by the British government (and became undesirable to Chin Peng himself) when the Communist leader headed his party's guerrilla insurgency against the British Empire during the Malayan Emergency.

See also
 Orders, decorations, and medals of the United Kingdom – the British honours system
 List of Knights Grand Cross of the Order of the British Empire
 List of Dames Grand Cross of the Order of the British Empire
 List of honorary British knights and dames
 United Kingdom order of precedence
 Honours Committee

Notes

References

Further reading
 
 Hood, Frederic (1967).  The Chapel of the Most Excellent Order of the British Empire, with a foreword by Prince Philip.
 "Knighthood and Chivalry" (1911). Encyclopædia Britannica, 11th ed., London: Cambridge University Press.

External links 

 Order of the British Empire – official website of the British Monarchy
 The Honours system – UK Government
 Queen's Birthday and New Year honours – The London Gazette, lists recipients of honours
 "The Most Excellent Order of the British Empire" (2002) – Cambridge University Heraldic and Genealogical Society
 "Order of Precedence in England and Wales", Velde, F. R. (2003) – Heraldica.org
 Search recommendations for the Order of the British Empire on the UK National Archives' website
 The Chapel of the Most Excellent Order of the British Empire – OBE Chapel Exterior detail – JPEG image, IanMcGrawPhotos.co.uk

 
British Empire, Order of the
1917 establishments in the United Kingdom
Awards established in 1917
British honours system
British Empire, Order of the
George V